Kamloops is a city in south-central British Columbia, Canada, at the confluence of the South flowing North Thompson River and the West flowing Thompson River, east of Kamloops Lake. It is located in the Thompson-Nicola Regional District, whose district offices are based here. The surrounding region is sometimes referred to as the Thompson Country.

The city was incorporated in 1893 with about 500 residents.  The Canadian Pacific Railroad was completed through downtown in 1886, and the Canadian National arrived in 1912, making Kamloops an important transportation hub.

With a 2021 population of 97,902, it is the twelfth largest municipality in the province. The Kamloops census agglomeration is ranked 36th among census metropolitan areas and agglomerations in Canada with a 2021 population of 114,142.

Kamloops is promoted as the Tournament Capital of Canada. It hosts more than 100 sporting tournaments each year  (hockey, baseball, curling, etc) at world-class sports facilities such as the Tournament Capital Centre, Kamloops Bike Ranch, and Tournament Capital Ranch.  Logging, Beef Cattle, Vegetable farming, Transportation, Viticulture, Health care, tourism, and education are major contributing industries to the regional economy and have grown in recent years. Thompson Rivers University (~25,000 students) was established as Cariboo College in 1970.

History 

The first European explorers arrived in 1811. David Stuart, a trader sent from Fort Astoria, then still a Pacific Fur Company post, spent a winter with the Secwépemc people. In May of the following year, trader Alexander Ross established a post, which was known as "Fort Cumcloups".

The rival North West Company established Fort Shuswap nearby in the same year. The two businesses merged in 1813 when the North West Company bought the operations of the Pacific Fur Company. In 1821, the Hudson's Bay Company took over the North West Company, and the post became known commonly as Thompson's River Post, or Fort Thompson. Later it was known as Fort Kamloops. The post's Chief Traders kept journals, which document a series of inter-Indian wars and personalities for the period, in addition to the daily business of the fur companies and their personnel along the entire Pacific Slope.

Soon after the forts were founded, Kwa'lila, chief of the main local village of the Secwépemc, moved his people closer to the trading post, so they could control access and gain in prestige and security. After Kwa'lila died, his nephew and foster son Nicola became chief. He later led an alliance of Syilx (Okanagan) and Nlaka'pamux peoples in the plateau country to the south around Stump, Nicola and Douglas lakes.

Relations between Nicola and the fur traders were often tense, but Chief Nicola was recognized for his aid to colonizers during the Fraser Canyon Gold Rush of 1858. He did try to control those who had been in parties waging violence and looting on the Okanagan Trail, which led from American territory to the Fraser goldfields. Throughout, Kamloops was an important way station on the route of the Hudson's Bay Brigade Trail, which connected Fort Astoria with Fort Alexandria and the other forts in New Caledonia to the north (today's Omineca Country, roughly). It was integral during the onset of the Cariboo Gold Rush as the main route to the new goldfields around what was to become Barkerville.

The 1862 Pacific Northwest smallpox epidemic swept through the Kamloops area during the summer of that year, decimating the Secwepemc, Nlaka'pamux, and other indigenous peoples. They had no acquired immunity. The epidemic had started in Victoria and quickly spread throughout British Columbia, especially among First Nations. In June 1862, indigenous people went to Fort Kamloops seeking smallpox vaccine, William Manson, chief clerk at the fort, vaccinated numerous persons, but fatalities were extremely high. In late September he reported "smallpox still raging amongst the Indians".

In October a newspaper in Victoria reported an eyewitness account from Fort Kamloops, saying 
"The Indians have been nearly exterminated at [Kamloops]: only sixteen have escaped out of a large settlement. Their bodies are strewing the ground in all directions."About two-thirds of the Secwepemc died during the epidemic. In the aftermath, colonists took over traditional lands of the Secwepemc and many other indigenous groups throughout British Columbia.

The gold rush of the 1860s and the construction of the Canadian Pacific Railway, which reached Kamloops from the West in 1885, brought further growth. The City of Kamloops was incorporated in 1893 with a population of about 500.

In 1908 due to the Tuberculosis Pandemic a sanatorium was opened west of the city named King Edward Memorial Sanatorium, the sanatorium was later acquired by the provincial government in 1921, being renamed to Tranquille Sanatorium, it later closed in 1958. The Tranquille Institution reopened in 1959 to treat people with mental problems it later closed in 1983.

In 1967, Kamloops amalgamated with the Town of North Kamloops.

The logging industry of the 1970s attracted many Indo-Canadian workers to the Kamloops area. They had come mostly from the Punjab region of India. In 1973, Kamloops amalgamated with the Districts of Brocklehurst, Dufferin, the Town of Valleyview, and the Kamloops Indian Band, and the communities of Dallas, Campbell Creek, Barnhart Vale, Heffley Creek, Rayleigh, Westsyde and Knutsford. In 1976, the Kamloops Indian Band split from the City of Kamloops.

In May 2021, an anthropologist announced she had used ground-penetrating radar to find "probable" graves containing the remains of 215 children found at a former Kamloops Indian residential school, part of the Canadian Indian residential school system. The story was reported around the world, and five Catholic churches in Western Canada were burned down in the weeks following, since the school was operated by a Catholic order. However, this story cannot be completely confirmed until bodies are exhumed.

Etymology
"Kamloops" is the anglicized version of the Shuswap word "Tk'əmlúps", meaning "meeting of the waters". Shuswap is still spoken in the area by members of the Tk'emlúps Indian Band.

An alternate origin sometimes given for the name may have come from the native name's accidental similarity to the French "Camp des loups", meaning "Camp of Wolves"; many early fur traders were ethnic French. There are folk stories about an attack on a traders' camp by a pack of wolves. Other legendary versions recount a huge white wolf, or a pack of wolves and other animals, that were moving overland from the Nicola Country and were repelled by a single shot by John Tod, then Chief Trader. This prevented the wolves from attacking the fort and earned Tod a great degree of respect locally.

Geography
Kamloops is in the Thompson Valley and the Montane Cordillera Ecozone. The city's centre is in the valley near the confluence of the Thompson River's north and south branches. Suburbs stretch for more than a dozen kilometres along the north and south branches, as well as to the steep hillsides along the south portion of the city and lower northeast hillsides.

Robert W. Service in 1904 described Kamloops as his delightful life and wrote "Life was pleasant, and the work was light. At four o'clock we were on our horses, riding over the rolling ridges, or into spectral gulches that rose to ghostlier mountains. It was like the scenery of Mexico, weirdly desolate and aridly morose. A discouraging land, forbidding in its weariness and resigned to ruin."

Kamloops Indian Band areas begin just to the northeast of the downtown core but are not within the city limits. As a result of this placement, it is necessary to leave Kamloops' city limits and pass through the band lands before re-entering the city limits to access the northernmost communities of Rayleigh and Heffley Creek. Kamloops is surrounded by the smaller communities of Cherry Creek, Pritchard, Savona, Scotch Creek, Adams Lake, Chase, Paul Lake, Pinantan and various others.

Neighbourhoods
Officially recognized neighbourhoods within the city of Kamloops.

Informally recognized sub-areas are listed beneath the neighbourhoods to which they belong:

 Aberdeen
Pacific Way
 Barnhartvale
 Batchelor Heights
Batchelor Hills
Lac Du Bois
 Brocklehurst
Airport Entry Corridor
Brock Centre
North Kamloops West
Ord Road
 Campbell Creek
 Dallas
 Downtown
Columbia Precinct
Downtown Core
East End
East Entry Corridor
Waterfront District
West Entry Corridor
 Dufferin
 Heffley Creek
 Iron Mask
Lac Le Jeune
 Juniper Ridge
 Knutsford
 Lower Sahali
 Mission Flats
 Noble Creek
 North Kamloops
8th St Corridor
Halston Corridor 
John Tod
McDonald Park
North Kamloops West
North Shore Town Centre
Schubert Drive
Tranquille Market
Tranquille South
 Pineview
 Rayleigh
 Rose Hill
 Sagebrush
 Southgate
 Thompson Rivers University (TRU)
 Tranquille
 Upper Sahali
 Valleyview
Orchard's Walk
 West End
College Heights
Guerin Creek
Hudson's Ridge
McIntosh Heights
Powers Addition
 Westsyde
 Westmount
 Oak Hills

Climate
The climate of Kamloops is semi-arid (Köppen climate classification BSk) due to its rain shadow location. Because of milder winters and aridity, the area west of Kamloops in the lower Thompson River valley falls within a desert (Köppen climate classification BWk) climate. Kamloops gets short cold snaps where temperatures can drop to around  when Arctic air manages to cross the Rockies and Columbia Mountains into the Interior.

Kamloops has the third mildest winter of any non-coastal city in Canada, after Penticton and Kelowna. Between November and January the area experiences abundant cloud cover reducing the annual sunshine output, despite very sunny summers.

Although Kamloops is above 50° north latitude, summers are warmer than in many places at lower latitudes, with prevailing dry and sunny weather. Daytime humidity sometimes drops below 20% during dry periods, which allows for substantial nighttime cooling. Occasional summer thunderstorms can create dry-lightning conditions, sometimes igniting forest fires which the area is prone to.

Kamloops lies in the rain shadow leeward of the Coast Mountains and is biogeographically connected to similar semi-desert areas in the Okanagan region, and a much larger area covering the central/eastern portions of Washington, Oregon and intermontane areas of Nevada, Utah and Idaho in the US.

These areas of relatively similar climate have many distinctive native plants and animals in common, such as ponderosa pine (Pinus ponderosa), big sagebrush (Artemisia tridentata), prickly pear cactus (Opuntia fragilis in this case), rattlesnakes, black widow spiders and Lewis's woodpecker.

Demographics

Religious groups 
According to the 2021 census, religious groups in Kamloops included:
Irreligion (57,245 persons or 60.5%)
Christianity (31,790 persons or 33.6%)
Sikhism (2,005 persons or 2.1%)
Hinduism (995 persons or 1.1%)
Islam (890 persons or 0.9%)
Buddhism (440 persons or 0.5%)
Indigenous Spirituality (190 persons or 0.2%)
Judaism (85 persons or 0.1%)

Ethnicity 

Note: Totals greater than 100% due to multiple origin responses.

Chinese Canadians 

Kamloops historically had a Chinatown on Victoria Street where most ethnic Chinese lived. John Stewart of the Kamloops Museum and Archives stated it was not a "true Chinatown". It was established by Chinese immigrants by 1887, and by 1890 the community had up to 400 Chinese. Stewart said this was an "amazingly large" population for the rural area. By the 1890s, about 33% of Kamloops were ethnic Chinese; they worked primarily on construction of the Canadian Pacific Railway.

Economic changes in Kamloops resulted in many Chinese seeking work elsewhere. In addition, there were two fires in 1892 and 1893, and a 1911–1914 demolition that dismantled the Chinatown. Peter Wing, the first ethnic Chinese mayor in North America, was elected in 1966 and served three terms as the Mayor of Kamloops.

In the 1880s the Kamloops' Chinese Cemetery was founded in Kamloops, the only one in the province dedicated to Chinese pioneers, It is one of the largest cemeteries in the province, but the last interment was made there in the 1960s.

In 2013 the provincial government announced it would begin a consultation process to discuss wording of a formal apology to Chinese in B.C. for past wrongs. Joe Leong, president of the Kamloops Chinese Cultural Association, said he believed that the province should build a museum to honour Chinese history in the province, as a way to recognize the contributions of the people. As Kamloops had the only cemetery dedicated to the Chinese pioneers, he felt this city would be an appropriate site for the museum.

Economy 

Kamloops' economy includes healthcare, tourism, education, transportation, and natural resource extraction industries.

The Royal Inland Hospital (RIH) is the city's largest employer. RIH is the region's acute care and health facility and is one of two tertiary referral hospitals in the Southern Interior with 239 acute beds and an additional 20 more beds upon completion of the expansion in 2016.

Thompson Rivers University (TRU) serves a student body of 25,754 including a diverse international contingent mainly from Asian countries. Thompson Rivers University, Open Learning (TRU-OL) is the biggest distance education provider in British Columbia and one of the biggest in Canada.

Heavy industries in the Kamloops area include primary resource processing such as Domtar Kamloops Pulp Mill, Tolko-Heffley Creek Plywood and Veneer, New Gold Inc - New Afton Mine, and Highland Valley Copper Mine (in Logan Lake).

Four major highways join in Kamloops, the BC Highway 1 (Trans-Canada Highway), the Coquihalla Highway (BC highway 5 south of the city), the Yellowhead Highway (BC Highway 5 north of the city) and BC Highway 97, making it a transportation hub and a place which attracts business. There are over 50 trucking and transport companies located in Kamloops that ship across Canada and into the United States. Both the Canadian Pacific Railway and the Canadian National Railway service Kamloops with both lines running through the city.

Tourism
Kamloops welcomed 1.8 million visitors in 2017, a 9% increase from 2015 (1.64 million).

Tourism's economic ROI is immense. A$1.8 million destination marketing budget returned $449 million in economic benefit in 2017.The annual Direct Visitor Expenditure is estimated at $270 million, a 19% increase from 2015 ($227 million). Further, the total estimated tourism economic impact was $449 million in 2017, a 32.4% increase from 2015 ($339 million).

Tourism generates many types of income for the region, including business income, wage earnings, share earnings, rates and levies. Conservation springs from industry-wide support for management, research and education initiatives that benefit everyone through responsible tourism management.

Kamloops has over 50 accommodation choices from major hotels to bed and breakfasts. Accommodation occupancy rates were 61.5% in 2017, up 2.6% from 2016.

Arts and culture

Kamloops culture has grown in recent years to celebrate local talent that includes: culinary arts, sports, live entertainment, and fine art.

Kamloops hosts a range of cultural events year-round including:
Kamloops Wine Festival: This annual festival is a fundraiser for the Kamloops Art Gallery.
Kamloops Film Festival: Since 1997, this festival has grown to celebrate international films at Paramount Theatre for ten days in March.
River Beaver Classic: This annual, mountain biking festival hosts four events over one weekend in April with all money raised going to local trail maintenance.
Brewloops Brewloops is a non-profit, beer, food, and bike festival that celebrates Kamloops culture with block parties on The Shore and Downtown throughout the year.
Kamloops International Buskers Festival: This four-day festival takes place throughout Riverside Park and showcases professional buskers from around the globe.
Hot Nite in the City Show 'n' Shine: This weekend-long event takes place every August downtown and showcases Street Rods, Customs, American Muscle, Sport-compact, Electric Vehicles and more.
Kamloops Rotary Ribfest: Western Canada's largest rib festival, Ribfest takes place every August at Riverside Park. By 2018, Kamloops Rotary had raised over $500,000 for local charities.
Salute to the Sockeye Festival: This festival celebrates the return of sockeye salmon to the Adams River at Tsútswecw Provincial Park from the end of September through mid-October each year.
Interior Wellness Festival: Since 2008, this event has promoted healthy living in BC including workshops with yogis, authors, and business experts.
Kamloops Comedy Fest: Canadian comedians take over the microphone for a weekend each October during Kamloops Comedy Fest.
Words Alive Kamloops: Formerly the Kamloops Writers Festival, this annual event features Canadian authors showcasing their work through public readings and events, as well as conducting workshops on a variety of topics.

Performing and fine arts 
Kamloops is home to many galleries including nationally recognized Kamloops Art Gallery, Secwepemc Museum and Heritage Park; the Kamloops Museum and Archives, the Kamloops Symphony Orchestra, and Western Canada Theatre.

There are 29 outdoor murals – the Back Alley Art Gallery- throughout downtown Kamloops that the Kamloops Central Business Improvement Association has spearheaded since the 2000s. Artists that have contributed to this project include: Zack Abney; Kylene Cachelin; Evan Christina; Kelly Wright; Ken Wells; Alex Moir-Porteus; Robin Hodgson; Jack Morris; Janice Gurney, and Marianna Abutalipova.

Project X Theatre, an outdoor theatre festival located in Kamloops. The company creates a summer outdoor theatre festival in Prince Charles Park, just east of Downtown Kamloops. Established in 2006, Project X Theatre originally produced productions of Shakespeare, however, recently the company has shifted over to more family friendly shows. Randi Edmundson is the current Artistic Director. Previous artistic directors include Samantha Mcdonanld, Derek Rein, Heather Cant, Melissa 
purcha, and Dušan Magdolen.

The Western Canada Theatre is a professional theatre company located in Kamloops. The company manages and performs in two spaces: the 706 seat Sagebrush Theatre and the 150-seat Pavilion Theatre. James MacDonald is the current artistic director of the theatre company. Previous artistic directors include Tom Kerr (founder), Frank Glassen, David Ross, Michael Dobbin, John Cooper, Jeremy Tow, and Daryl Cloran.

Attractions
Popular attractions include: the Adams River Sockeye Salmon Run; Kamloops Bike Ranch; BC Wildlife Park; Kamloops Heritage Railway; Kamloops Wine Trail; Secwepemc Museum, and Tranquille Sanatorium

Since 2012, four wineries have been established in the Thompson Valley wine region including: Sagewood Winery; Harper's Trail Winery; Monte Creek Ranch Winery, and Privato Vineyard and Winery. Since 2010, five micro-breweries have opened up in Kamloops including: Noble Pig Brewhouse; Red Collar Brewing, Alchemy Brewing, Bright Eye Brewing and Iron Road Brewing. Since 2020, some craft distilleries have opened up in Kamloops including: Route 1 Distillery

Food and drink 
Since 2007, Chefs in the City has been established as a "celebration of culinary arts, fine wine and beer from Kamloops and the surrounding region." In 2018, 21 local restaurants will have participated, as well as 10 local wineries and breweries. This annual event is presented by the Rotary Club of Kamloops and has raised over $325,000 since 2007.

Kamloops is emerging as an award-winning wine region with a climate perfect for growing grapes. It is home to four award-winning wineries: Harper's Trail, Monte Creek Ranch, Privato and Sagewood. Kamloops has over 120 acres under vine. The top grapes planted by local wineries are Riesling, Chardonnay, pinot gris, pinot noir, Cabernet Franc, Marechal Foch and Marquette.

Since 1998, the Kamloops Wine Festival has taken place in the spring as a fundraiser to support the Kamloops Art Gallery. The Kamloops Wine Festival had raised over $200,000 by 2018.

In 2014, Brewloops Beer Festival was established as a non-profit organization that promotes Kamloops culture across the city throughout the year. Brewloops celebrates BC craft beer, music, and entertainment with the wider Kamloops community and had donated $27,000 to community groups by 2018. Bands that have performed at Brewloops include: Delhi 2 Dublin, Yukon Blonde, and at Mission Dolores.

Recreation

Kamloops is an outdoor mecca for activities like hiking and mountain biking with an extensive trail network for year-round adventure. Multiple nearby lakes offer paddling, kayaking and fishing.

Known as the Tournament Capital of Canada, Kamloops has hosted many tournaments and is home to a range of professional athletes from many sports.  Kamloops has the Kamloops Sports Hall of Fame, which includes 2008 Summer Olympics bronze medallist Dylan Armstrong and the National Finalist Roma's soccer team.

Fishing 
With 100 lakes within an hour's drive, Kamloops has some of the best freshwater fishing in North America. Every year, the Freshwater Fisheries Society of BC stocks lakes in the Thompson-Nicola region with roughly 1,000,000 fish including rainbow trout, brook trout, and kokanee salmon.

Kamloops is known for its professional anglers including Brian Chan, Jordan Oelrich, and Brennan Lund. Fishing guides in the Kamloops area include: DNA Fly Fishing; Interior Fly Fishing; Maricle Fly Fishing; Riseform Flyfishing; and Fast Action Fishing Adventures.

Mountain biking 
Kamloops' extensive trail network and desert-like climate creates world-class conditions for year-round mountain biking across the city. Popular parks include the Kamloops Bike Ranch, Pineview Valley; Lac du Bois Grasslands Protected Area, and Kenna Cartwright Park. Two time UCI Mountain Bike & Trials World Championships – Women's cross-country (2011 and 2014), gold at the 2014 Commonwealth Games and 2016 Summer Olympics bronze medallist Catharine Pendrel lives and trains in Kamloops. Kamloops is home to world-famous mountain bikers such as freeride pioneers and Mountain Bike Hall of Fame members Wade Simmons, Brett Tippie, (also a former Canadian National Team member for snowboard cross and giant slalom), and Richie Schley. Freeriders Matt Hunter, and Graham Agassiz also live in Kamloops. Kamloops was featured in the first mountain bike film by Greg Stump, Pulp Traction, and later the first three Kranked films, which starred the original Fro Riders, Tippie, Simmons and Schley.

Ongoing trail maintenance has been spearheaded by local organizations such as the Kamloops Bike Riders Association, Kamloops Performance Cycling Centre, and Dirt Chix Kamloops.

Golf 
Kamloops has highest number of golf courses (13) per capita in Canada and boasts one of Canada's most diverse golf landscapes. Golfers enjoy three seasons of golf due to the dry and hot climate of the area. Several of the local golf courses have been designed by famous golf architects such as Robert Trent Jones, Graham Cooke, and Tom McBroom.

The 13 courses include: Tobiano Golf Course; The Dunes, Talking Rock Golf Course; Pineridge Golf Course; Rivershore Estates; Big Horn Golf & Country Club; Kamloops Golf & Country Club; Sun Peaks Golf; Eagle Point Golf Course; Mount Paul Golf Course, and Chinook Cove Golf.

Skiing 
Sun Peaks Resort is a nearby ski and snowboard hill. Olympic medallist skier Nancy Greene Raine is director of skiing at Sun Peaks and the former chancellor of Thompson Rivers University.

Lacrosse teams include the Thompson Okanagan Junior Lacrosse League's Kamloops Junior B Venom, as well as the junior ice hockey team the Kamloops Storm. Also calling Kamloops home is the Canadian Junior Football League's Kamloops Broncos, and Pacific Coast Soccer League's Kamloops Excel, both of whom play at Hillside Stadium.

Other recreation 
The Kamloops Rotary Skatepark at McArthur Island Park is one of Canada's largest skateboard parks. Also located at McArthur Island Park is NorBrock Stadium, the McArthur Island Sports and Events Centre and the McArthur Island Curling Club. The city boasts 82 parks which are great for hiking, including Kenna Cartwright Park, the largest municipal park in British Columbia.

Sports

Hockey 
Kamloops is home to the Western Hockey League's Kamloops Blazers who play at the Sandman Centre. Alumni of the Kamloops Blazers include Mark Recchi, Jarome Iginla, Darryl Sydor, Nolan Baumgartner, Shane Doan, Scott Niedermayer, Rudy Poeschek and Darcy Tucker (Recchi, Doan, Iginla, and Sydor are now part-owners of the club). Two-time champion coach Ken Hitchcock would later win the Stanley Cup with the Dallas Stars.

On 6 February 2016, Kamloops hosted Hockey Day in Canada with Ron MacLean and Don Cherry.

Sports tournaments 
Kamloops hosted the 1993 Canada Summer Games. It co-hosted (with Vancouver and Kelowna) the IIHF World Junior Championship from 26 December 2005 to 5 January 2006. It hosted the 2006 BC Summer Games and 2018 BC Winter Games. In the summer of 2008, Kamloops, and its modern facility the Tournament Capital Centre played host to the U15 boys and girls Basketball National Championship.

Kamloops hosted the World Masters Indoor Championships in March 2010.

Kamloops hosted the 2011 Western Canada Summer Games.

Kamloops hosted the 2014 Tim Hortons Brier (The Canadian Men's Curling Championships).

Kamloops hosted the 2014 edition of the 4 Nations Cup.

Government
Elections into the municipality in Kamloops are held with the rest of the province every four years.

Provincially, Kamloops is considered to be bellwether, having voted for the governing party in every provincial election since the introduction of parties to British Columbian elections, until 2017. By contrast, Kamloops has regularly voted against the party in power federally until the 2006 Federal election. Kamloops is represented in two provincial ridings – Kamloops-South Thompson and Kamloops-North Thompson – and one federal riding – Kamloops—Thompson—Cariboo.
 Mayor – Reid Hamer-Jackson, 2022
 Members of the Legislative Assembly:
 Todd Stone, Kamloops-South Thompson
 Peter Milobar, Kamloops-North Thompson

Federal members of parliament:
 Cathy McLeod (2008–present) Conservative Party of Canada
 Betty Hinton (2000–2008) Canadian Alliance and Conservative Party of Canada
 Nelson Riis (1980–2000) New Democratic Party
 Don Cameron (1979–1980) Progressive Conservative Party of Canada
 Leonard Marchand (1968–1979) Liberal Party of Canada

Infrastructure

Transportation
Kamloops is located at the crossroads of the Coquihalla Highway, Yellowhead Highway, and Trans-Canada Highway and is a transportation hub in the region.

The Canadian Pacific (CPR) and Canadian National (CNR) mainline routes connect Vancouver in the west with Kamloops. The two railways diverge to the north and east where they connect with the rest of Canada. Kamloops North station is served three times per week (in each direction) by Via Rail's Canadian.

The Rocky Mountaineer and the Kamloops Heritage Railway both use the Kamloops station.

Kamloops is home to Kamloops Airport (YKA). Airlines flying to Kamloops include: Air Canada Express, WestJet Encore, Canadian North, and Central Mountain Air, as well as three cargo airlines. Vancouver and Calgary are primary routes for passenger service to this regional airport. In 2018, Air Canada Rouge launched non-stop seasonal service from Kamloops to Toronto.

Greyhound Canada previously connected Kamloops with Vancouver, Edmonton and Calgary, with service ending at the end of October 2018. After Greyhound's departure, several companies stepped in and commenced intercity service. Ebus and Rider Express both provide service to Vancouver and in between cities and towns, with Ebus connecting to other Interior cities like Kelowna and Vernon, and Rider Express continuing east to Calgary.

Local bus service is provided by Kamloops Transit System and funded through BC Transit with 14 routes across the Kamloops area that are operated by contractor First Student Canada. In 2018, the City of Kamloops partnered with the Tk'emlúps te Secwépemc to expand its services on Tk'emlups te Secwepemc land for Route 18: Mount Paul.

Education

Residential School
The Kamloops Indian Residential School, part of the Canadian Indian residential school system opened in 1893 and ran until 1977. In May 2021, the possible remains of 200 children were detected in the graveyard soil by ground penetrating radar at the site of the school. The remains were located with the assistance of ground-penetrating radar, and work was underway to determine if related records about the identities of the dead are held at the Royal British Columbia Museum. In a statement released by the First Nations Health Authority, CEO Richard Jock said: "That this situation exists is sadly not a surprise and illustrates the damaging and lasting impacts that the residential school system continues to have on First Nations people, their families and communities."

K-12
Public schools in Kamloops and adjacent communities are run by School District 73 Kamloops/Thompson.

Private schools include Kamloops Christian School, Our Lady of Perpetual Help School (Catholic), and St. Ann's Academy (Catholic).

The Conseil scolaire francophone de la Colombie-Britannique operates école Collines-d’or, a Francophone primary school.

Post-secondary
Thompson Rivers University offers a range of undergraduate and graduate degrees as well as certificate and diploma programs. It has satellite campuses in:

 Clearwater
 Barriere
 Chase
 Williams Lake
 100 Mile House
 Cache Creek
 Ashcroft
 Lillooet

Thompson Rivers University also has an open-learning division. Thompson Rivers University, Open Learning (TRU-OL) is the biggest distance and online education provider in British Columbia and one of the biggest in Canada. The Thompson Rivers University WolfPack are the athletic teams that represent Thompson Rivers University.

Thompson Career College and Sprott Shaw College are private post-secondary institutions with campuses in Kamloops.

Media

The city's main daily newspaper was The Kamloops Daily News which ceased publication in 2014.
The city is also home to Kamloops This Week, a free newspaper which publishes three times a week.

Notable people

Below is a list of people who are from Kamloops, or who lived there for an extended period.

Historical figures
 Robert Barton, flying ace of the Second World War
 Edward Bellew, recipient of the Victoria Cross.
 Jim Chamberlin, aerodynamicist, who contributed to the design of the Canadian Avro Arrow; NASA's Project Mercury, Project Gemini and the Apollo program.
 Kanao Inouye, the notorious "Kamloops Kid", the first of the two Canadians ever convicted of war crimes.
 Allan McLean, son of Donald McLean and leader of the outlaw gang known as the Wild McLean Boys.
 Donald McLean, former Chief Trader of Fort Kamloops and one of the casualties of the Chilcotin War.
 Frank Robert Miller, former deputy minister of the National Defence.
 Chief Nicola, conjoint chief of the Nicolas and the Kamloops Secwepemc during the fur trade and gold rush eras.
 Johnny Ussher, settler, provincial magistrate and gold commissioner (killed by Allan McLean).
 Mark Sweeten Wade, medical doctor, newspaperman and historian.

Politicians
 Jack Davis, politician who was elected to both the Parliament of Canada and Legislative Assembly of British Columbia.
 Jodie Emery – marijuana activist and politician.
 John L. Frazer, politician: member of the House of Commons of Canada from 1993 to 1997.
 Davie Fulton, politician: member of the Canadian House of Commons from 1945 to 1963, and 1965 to 1968. Son of Frederick John Fulton.
 Frederick John Fulton, British born politician and lawyer, father of Davie Fulton.
 Phil Gaglardi, aka Flying Phil, former Provincial Minister of Highways and Mayor of the city.
 Leonard Marchand, QPC, CM, the first person of First Nations ethnicity to serve in the federal cabinet and the first Status Indian to serve as a member of parliament.
 Nelson Riis, former Kamloops Teacher, Professor, alderman and Director of the Thompson-Nicola Regional District, longtime federal MP for Kamloops.
 Peter Wing, North America's first elected mayor of Chinese descent, elected in 1966 and served three terms in Kamloops.

Athletes
 Graham Agassiz, freeride mountain biker, bronze medal at Red Bull Rampage 2015.
 Dylan Armstrong, Olympic shot putter who finished 4th in the 2008 Olympics but subsequently was awarded the bronze medal in 2015 after the 3rd place putter Andrei Mikhnevich from Belarus tested positive for drugs post 2008 Olympics.
 Don Ashby, former National Hockey League (NHL) ice hockey player.
 Murray Baron, former NHL ice hockey player.
 Mitch Berger, former National Football League (NFL) player.
 Rick Boh, former NHL ice hockey player.
 Corryn Brown, Canadian curler, skip of the 2013 Canadian Junior Curling Championships winning rink, 2012 Winter Youth Olympics bronze medallist.
 Jim Cotter, Canadian curler, 2013 Olympic Trials runner up, 2014 Tim Hortons Brier silver medallist.
 Craig Endean, former NHL ice hockey player.
 Todd Esselmont, ice and roller hockey player.
 Erin Gammel, is a swimmer who competed at the 2004 Summer Olympics.
 Stu Grimson, former NHL ice hockey player.
 Don Hay, former NHL head coach.
 Jessica Hewitt, short track speed skater, silver medallist at the 2014 Sochi Olympics.
 Joe Hicketts, 2015 World Junior Ice Hockey Champion, Detroit Red Wings defenceman.
 Murray Kennett, is a former World Hockey Association (WHA) ice hockey player.
 Doug Lidster, former NHL ice hockey player.
John Ludvig, professional ice hockey player
 Bert Marshall, former NHL ice hockey player.
 Spencer McLennan, Former Canadian Football League (CFL) player.
 Don Moen, Former CFL football player.
 Josie Morrison, Canadian speedskater, 2018 Winter Olympian.
 Bob Mowat, former WHA ice hockey player.
Brendon Nash, former NHL ice hockey player
Riley Nash, Toronto Maple Leafs NHL hockey player
 Shane Niemi, is a Canadian sprinter.
 Kelly Olynyk, Miami Heat and Canada international basketball player.
 Paul Osbaldiston, former CFL football player.
 Catharine Pendrel, cross country mountain biker, 2016 Olympic bronze medalist, 2011 and 2014 World Champion
 Rudy Poeschek, former NHL player.
 Kevin Powell, former CFL football player.
 Nancy Greene Raine, named Canada's Athlete of the Century in 1999, Olympic skier who won gold for Canada in 1968, and 13 World Cups (the Canadian record) for a total of 17 Canadian Title Championships.
 Mark Recchi, former NHL ice hockey player, three time Stanley Cup champion (1991, 2006, 2011), and member of the Hockey Hall of Fame
 Justin Ring, former CFL football player
 Peter Soberlak, former American Hockey League (AHL) professional ice hockey player.
 Dave Vankoughnett, former CFL football player.
 Tim Watters, former NHL ice hockey player.

Arts, culture and media
 Benjamin Ayres, actor, born in Kamloops.
 Dan Bremnes, Christian musician, born in Kamloops.
 Steven Galloway, novelist, was raised in Kamloops.
 Elise Gatien, actress.
 Boris Karloff, actor, joined the Jeanne Russell theatre company in Kamloops in September 1911.
 Chris Masuak, punk rock singer-songwriter, inducted into the ARIA Hall of Fame, born in Kamloops – lived in Brocklehurst (North Kamloops) in the 1960s. Now resides in Spain.
 John Pozer, award-winning filmmaker.
 Robert W. Service, poet and writer known for his ballads depicting the Klondike Gold Rush of 1897, he worked at Kamloops branch of the Canadian Bank of Commerce from July to December 1904 before being transferred to Whitehorse.
 Michael Shanks, actor, born in Vancouver, but grew up in Kamloops.
 Lawrence Paul Yuxweluptun, First Nations painter.

Other notable people
 Nadine Caron, first female First Nations surgeon.
 Andrew Collier, Commander of the Royal Canadian Navy.
 Patrick Crawford, tech entrepreneur and NASA research collaborator.
 Vivian Dowding, leading birth control activist.
 Mildred Gottfriedson, first First Nations individual inducted into the Order of Canada and founding member of the B.C. Native Women's Society.
 Lesra Martin, resident lawyer who helped with Rubin "The Hurricane" Carter's prison release.

Planetary nomenclature

The city's name has been given to a crater on the surface of Mars. Crater Kamloops was officially adopted by the International Astronomical Union's Working Group for Planetary System Nomenclature (IAU/WGPSN) in 1991.

Sister cities
 Uji, Kyoto Prefecture, Japan
 Bacolod, Negros Occidental, Philippines

In popular culture
In "Cementhead," a 1989 episode of the television series Booker, the titular detective (played by Richard Grieco) tracks a capricious professional hockey player (Stephen Shellen) back to his hometown of Kamloops.

Kamloops and surrounding areas have been used for various Hollywood films such as An Unfinished Life, The A Team, 2012, The Pledge, Shooter, Firewall, The Sisterhood of the Travelling Pants, Monster Trucks, and various others.

"The Eye of Jupiter", the eleventh episode of the third season of Battlestar Galactica was filmed in Kamloops in 2006.

Kamloops was a filming location for the Netflix series Lost in Space.

See also
 List of place names in Canada of Indigenous origin
 Kamloops Indian Residential School

References

Notes

External links

 
1811 establishments in Canada
Cities in British Columbia
Hudson's Bay Company trading posts
Populated places established in 1811
Populated places in the Thompson-Nicola Regional District
Thompson Country